The Aristocrats are a rock supergroup formed in 2011.  The instrumental power trio consists of Guthrie Govan, Bryan Beller, and Marco Minnemann. The group name is inspired by the Aristocrats joke and consequently the song titles on their eponymous debut album are rife with salacious double-entendres.

Formation and history 
The band was formed after a wildly enthusiastic response to a concert performance at The Anaheim Bass Bash during the Winter NAMM show in January 2011. The trio had just one rehearsal before the concert but still performed well and amazed the audience as well as themselves. Originally the guitarist for that one-off show was to be Greg Howe, replaced by Guthrie Govan at the last moment. Guthrie later stated: "The chemistry was so great, that when we came offstage we all said to each other: 'This is working. We should record this.'" The band would later get together and meet in Chicago to record their debut album, which took just under two weeks. The music album reflected their respective influences, ranging from 70s fusion (Return to Forever), to progressive (King Crimson), to instrumental rock (Steve Vai, Joe Satriani), to rap metal (Rage Against the Machine) and to just plain absurdity (Frank Zappa). Bassist Bryan Beller stated, "We ended up using our different influences to write for each other. I wrote "Sweaty Knockers" specifically for Guthrie to have fun with, while Guthrie wrote “I Want A Parrot” with bass leads in mind. As for Marco's material, we're just lucky to be able to keep up with it!”.

After releasing their debut in September 2011, the trio toured for the year 2012. Later in the same year the band released its first live album, Boing, We'll Do It Live!. Footage and sound for this release were recorded in two concerts held at Alvas Showroom in Los Angeles, California. During those concerts the band played material from their debut album as well as songs from each band members' solo projects.

In July 2013, their second studio album Culture Clash was released, which was followed by a supporting tour; first in North America in 2013 and then in Europe, South America, and Asia in 2014. After the tour, the band compiled excerpts of performances from six different venues for their upcoming second live album, Culture Clash Live!, to be released on CD and DVD on January 20, 2015. On the same day, the band releases their "official bootleg" of the tour, a limited edition 2CD set titled Secret Show: Live in Osaka. During their January 2015 tour, the band debuted material for their third studio album Tres Caballeros. The album was recorded in February and released on June 23, 2015. In support of the album, the band toured in North America in summer 2015 and in Europe from November 2015 to February 2016.

In 2016 they took part in the G3 tour, along with Joe Satriani and Steve Vai.

September - October 2016, the band toured India, Bangladesh, Nepal, Thailand, Hong Kong, Taiwan, Japan & Australia booked by their Asian agency jellybeard.

After this tour, The Aristocrats decided to take a long sabbatical, focusing on their own solo endeavors and touring with other acts (BB/MM Joe Satriani, GG Hans Zimmer) throughout 2017 & 2018.

In December 2018 The Aristocrats announced they were going into the studio again early March 2019 to record their 4th studio album. The 4th album, You Know What? was recorded in the Brotheryn Studios in Ojai California and released in June 2019.

Discography 
Studio albums
The Aristocrats (2011)
Culture Clash (2013)
Tres Caballeros (2015)
 You Know What...? (2019)
The Aristocrats With Primuz Chamber Orchestra (2022)
UNKNOWN - TBD (exp. Sept. 2023)

Live albums
Boing, We'll Do It Live! (2012)
Culture Clash Live! (2015)
Secret Show: Live in Osaka (2015)
FREEZE! Live In Europe 2020 (2021)

Band members
Guthrie Govan – guitar
Bryan Beller – bass
Marco Minnemann – drums

References 

American instrumental musical groups
American progressive rock groups
American jazz ensembles
Jazz fusion ensembles
Musical groups established in 2011
American musical trios
Rock music supergroups
2011 establishments in the United States